Ucha Pind  is a village in Phagwara Tehsil in Kapurthala district of Punjab State, India. The village is administrated by a Sarpanch who is an elected representative of village as per the constitution of India and Panchayati raj (India).

Transport

References

External links
  Villages in Kapurthala
 Kapurthala Villages List

Villages in Kapurthala district